is a city located in Yamagata Prefecture, Japan. , the city had an estimated population of 23,643 in 8133  households, and a population density of 120 persons per km².

Geography
Murayama is located in northeast Yamagata Prefecture, in a river valley of the Mogami River, with branches of the Ōu Mountains to the east and west.

Neighboring municipalities
Yamagata Prefecture
Sagae
Higashine
Obanazawa
Kahoku
Ōishida
Ōkura
Funagata

Climate
Murayama has a Humid continental climate (Köppen climate classification Dfa) with large seasonal temperature differences, with warm to hot (and often humid) summers and cold (sometimes severely cold) winters. Precipitation is significant throughout the year, but is heaviest from August to October.

Demographics
Per Japanese census data, the population of Murayama has declined steadily over the past 70 years and is now less than it was a century ago.

History
The area of present-day Murayama was part of ancient Dewa Province. After the start of the Meiji period, the area became part of Kitamurayama District, Yamagata Prefecture. The town of Tateoka was established with the establishment of the modern municipalities system on April 1, 1889. The city of Murayama was established on April 1, 1954 with the merger of Tateoka with the villages of Nishigo, Okura, Tozawa, Okubo and Fumoto.

Murayama became the registered host town for the Bulgarian rhythmic gymnastics team for the Tokyo 2020 Olympic Games. In 2019, during Japan's national "Host Town Summit 2019", Murayama received first-place awards in each of the three award categories: "Best Host Town Leader," "Best Communicator," and "Poster Session". Bulgaria went on to win the gold medal in the group all-around competition.

Government
Higashine has a mayor-council form of government with a directly elected mayor and a unicameral city legislature of 16 members. The city contributes one member to the Yamagata Prefectural Assembly.  In terms of national politics, the city is part of Yamagata District 2 of the lower house of the Diet of Japan.

Economy
The economy of Murayama is based on agriculture.

Education
Murayama has eight public elementary schools and two public middle schools operated by the city government and two public high schools operated by the Yamagata Prefectural Board of Education

Transportation

Railway
 East Japan Railway Company - Yamagata Shinkansen
 
 East Japan Railway Company - Ōu Main Line
  -

Highway
  – Murayama Interchange

Twin towns – sister cities

 Yakutsk, Russia, since April 21, 1992

Murayama also has friendly relations with Barrie, Canada.

Noted people from Murayama
Toshizo Matsuoka, longtime House of Representatives member from Yamagata
Tokunai Mogami, Edo period samurai and explorer
Tōru Murakawa, movie director

References

External links
 
Official Website 

 
Cities in Yamagata Prefecture